This article lists notable tsunamis, which are sorted by the date and location that the tsunami occurred.

Because of seismic and volcanic activity associated with tectonic plate boundaries along the Pacific Ring of Fire, tsunamis occur most frequently in the Pacific Ocean, but are a worldwide natural phenomenon. They are possible wherever large bodies of water are found, including inland lakes, where they can be caused by landslides and glacier calving. Very small tsunamis, non-destructive and undetectable without specialized equipment, occur frequently as a result of minor earthquakes and other events.

Around 1600 BC, a tsunami caused by the eruption of Thira devastated the Minoan civilization on Crete and related cultures in the Cyclades, as well as in areas on the Greek mainland facing the eruption, such as the Argolid.

The oldest recorded tsunami occurred in 479 BC. It destroyed a Persian army that was attacking the town of Potidaea in Greece.

As early as 426 BC, the Greek historian Thucydides inquired in his book History of the Peloponnesian War (3.89.1–6) about the causes of tsunamis. He argued that such events could only be explained as a consequence of ocean earthquakes, and could see no other possible causes.

Prehistoric

Before 1001 CE

1000–1700 CE

1700s

1800s

1900–1950

1950–2000

2000-2010

2011-2020

2021-present

Highest or tallest

Deadliest
The deadliest tsunami in recorded history was the 2004 Indian Ocean tsunami, which killed almost 230,000 people in fourteen countries including (listed in order of confirmed fatalities) Indonesia, Sri Lanka, India, Thailand, Somalia, Myanmar, Maldives, Malaysia, Tanzania, Seychelles, Bangladesh, South Africa, Yemen and Kenya.

See also

 List of deadly earthquakes since 1900
 List of natural disasters by death toll
 List of tsunamis in Europe
 Lists of earthquakes
 Prehistoric tsunamis
 Tsunamis affecting the British Isles
 Tsunamis in lakes

References

Footnotes

Bibliography

External links 
 Tinti S., Maramai A., Graziani L. (2007). The Italian Tsunami Catalogue (ITC), Version 2 (Windows software database)

 
Articles containing video clips